{{DISPLAYTITLE:C25H28O5}}
The molecular formula C25H28O5 (molar mass: 408.49 g/mol, exact mass: 408.1937 u) may refer to:

 Debromomarinone
 Isoemericellin

Molecular formulas